Alberto Andrade Carmona Park, better known as Love Park, is a public park in Lima, Peru.

Overview
It is located on the Cisneros boardwalk, a place that makes up the Miraflores boardwalk. The park is the location of El beso, a sculpture by Víctor Delfín. It was inaugurated on February 14, 1993. The park is surrounded by mosaics with phrases and poems about love in Spanish and Quechua. The trencadís decoration is inspired by Park Güell in Barcelona, Spain, designed by Antoni Gaudí. It was chosen by National Geographic magazine as one of the most romantic places in the world.

In 2014 it was renamed Alberto Andrade Carmona Park, in honor of the late mayor of Lima.

References

Parks in Peru
Geography of Lima